This is an incomplete list of New York State Historic Markers in Delaware County, New York. A fuller list is available from the Association of Public Historians of New York State.

Listings county-wide

See also
List of New York State Historic Markers
National Register of Historic Places listings in New York
List of National Historic Landmarks in New York
National Register of Historic Places listings in Delaware County, New York

References

Delaware County, New York
Delaware